The Woman in Red (French: La femme en rouge) is a 1947 French crime film directed by Louis Cuny and starring Jean Debucourt, Pierre Larquey and Andrex.

The film's sets were designed by the art director Lucien Carré.

Cast

References

Bibliography 
 Rège, Philippe. Encyclopedia of French Film Directors, Volume 1. Scarecrow Press, 2009.

External links 
 

1947 films
French crime films
1947 crime films
1940s French-language films
Films directed by Louis Cuny
French black-and-white films
1940s French films

fr:La Femme en rouge